Rodrick Rochelle Monroe (July 31, 1976 – May 7, 2017) was an American football tight end in the National Football League (NFL) for the Atlanta Falcons and  Cleveland Browns. He was drafted by the Dallas Cowboys in the seventh round of the 1998 NFL Draft. He played college football at the University of Cincinnati.

Early years
Monroe attended Hearne High School in Hearne, Texas, where he was an All-district tight end. As a senior, he was a McDonald's All-American selection in basketball.

He first enrolled at McLennan Community College, where he was one of the top rebounders in junior college. He transferred to the University of Cincinnati after his sophomore season, where he played for the basketball team under coach Bob Huggins, along with future NBA players Danny Fortson and Ruben Patterson.

Monroe averaged 3.2 points and 2.9 rebounds per game in the 1995-96 season, backing up Fortson at small forward and helping the team win the Conference USA title and reach the NCAA Elite Eight. His best game was against the University of Arizona, collecting 11 points and 7 rebounds.

He averaged 4.6 points and 2.5 rebounds in the 1996-97 season, contributing to the team winning the Conference USA title and qualifying for the NCAA Tournament second round. He also was considered the strongest player on the team, bench-pressing 415 pounds and leg-pressing 1,130 pounds, both basketball school records at the time.

In 1997, he walked-on to the football team as a fifth year senior in August, after being out of football for 4 years. He became a regular starter at tight end when Josh Anderson suffered a torn ACL against the University of Houston on October 18. He was used mostly as a blocker, finishing with 4 starts, 2 receptions for 33 yards, one touchdown and 30 knockdown blocks.

Professional career
Monroe was selected by the Dallas Cowboys in the seventh round (237th overall) of the 1998 NFL Draft. He was waived on August 24. On September 1, 1998, he was signed by the Atlanta Falcons. Monroe was deactivated for Super Bowl XXXIII. He was released on August 19, 2000.

On August 22, 2000, he was signed by the Jacksonville Jaguars. Monroe was cut from the practice squad on September 6. The Miami Dolphins signed him to their practice squad on September 26, 2000. He was released on October 10.

On December 7, 2000, he was signed by the Cleveland Browns to their practice squad. In the 2001 offseason Monroe was allocated to the Frankfurt Galaxy of NFL Europe, where he caught 23 passes for 362 yards and 2 touchdowns. He was placed on the injured reserve list in 2002 and 2003.

Personal life
Monroe was the youngest of 7 brothers and 3 sisters. He died on May 7, 2017, after suffering a heart attack while exercising. He was 40 years old at the time of his death.

References

External links
Just Sports Stats

1976 births
2017 deaths
People from Hearne, Texas
Players of American football from Texas
American football tight ends
African-American players of American football
McLennan Community College alumni
Cincinnati Bearcats men's basketball players
Cincinnati Bearcats football players
Atlanta Falcons players
Jacksonville Jaguars players
Miami Dolphins players
Frankfurt Galaxy players
Cleveland Browns players
American men's basketball players
20th-century African-American sportspeople
21st-century African-American sportspeople